Paolo Sorrentino (born 31 May 1970) is an Italian film director, screenwriter, and writer. His 2013 film The Great Beauty won the Academy Award, the Golden Globe, and the Bafta Award for Best Foreign Language Film. In Italy he was honoured with eight David di Donatello and six Nastro d'Argento. 

Sorrentino's direction and screenplays, including Il divo, The Consequences of Love, The Family Friend, This Must Be the Place and the 2016 TV series The Young Pope, have received three Cannes Lions, four Venice Film Festival Awards and four European Film Awards. 

He works with authors and producers including Francesca Cima and Nicola Giuliano, Toni Servillo and Luca Bigazzi. Actors in his films have included Sabrina Ferilli,  Fanny Ardant, Isabella Ferrari, Elena Sofia Ricci, Sean Penn, Frances McDormand, Riccardo Scamarcio, Jude Law, Fabrizio Bentivoglio, Nanni Moretti, Filippo Scotti, Carlo Verdone,  Antonio Albanese and Frank Langella. 

He has also worked with songwriters Antonello Venditti, Paloma Faith and Mark Kozelek and written three books published in Italian.

Life and career
Sorrentino was born in the Arenella district of Naples in 1970, and was orphaned at age 16 after losing both of his parents. His first film as a screenwriter, The Dust of Naples, was released in 1998. He also began directing short movies, including L'amore non ha confini in 1998 and La notte lunga in 2001. His feature-length debut was One Man Up, for which he was awarded the Nastro D'Argento prize.

He achieved international recognition in 2004 for his thriller The Consequences of Love. The film, which explores the mindset of a lonely businessman being used as a pawn by the Mafia, won many awards and was nominated for the Palme d'Or at the 2004 Cannes Film Festival.

Sorrentino's next feature, The Family Friend, was shown at the Cannes Film Festival in May and the London Film Festival in October 2006; it tells the story of a malicious septuagenarian loan shark who develops a fixation with the daughter of one of his customers. Sorrentino made his acting debut the same year with a cameo appearance in Nanni Moretti's film The Caiman, which was also shown at the 2006 London Film Festival.

Sorrentino's following film, Il Divo, is a dramatised biopic of Giulio Andreotti, the controversial Italian politician. The feature, which won the Prix du Jury at Cannes Film Festival, sees Sorrentino reunited with The Consequences of Love star Toni Servillo, who plays the part of Andreotti. In 2009, it was announced Sorrentino wrote the screenplay for a film version of Niccolò Ammaniti's novel Ti prendo e ti porto via (Steal You Away).

This Must Be the Place marked the English-language feature debut of the Italian filmmaker. The plot centres on a middle-aged, wealthy rock star, played by two-time Academy Award winner Sean Penn, who becomes bored in his retirement and takes on the quest of finding the guard of the German camp where his father was imprisoned, who now lives in hiding in the United States. The film was co-written by Sorrentino and Umberto Contarello, and premiered in competition at the 2011 Cannes Film Festival.

His 2013 film The Great Beauty won the Oscar for Best Foreign Language Film in the 2014 Academy Awards. It won the Bafta award for Best Film Not in the English Language in the 67th British Academy Film Awards. It also won the Golden Globe for Best Foreign Language Film and was nominated for the Palme d'Or at the 2013 Cannes Film Festival. The film also received several accolades at the 2013 European Film Awards, including "Best Film" and "Best Director" for Sorrentino.

Youth (2015) is Sorrentino's second English-language film, and features Michael Caine as a retired orchestra conductor. It competed for the Palme d'Or at the 2015 Cannes Film Festival.

In 2019, it was announced that Sorrentino would be directing Jennifer Lawrence as mob informant Arlyne Brickman in Mob Girl.  The film is an adaptation of the book of the same name by Teresa Carpenter. Sorrentino will also be working as a co-producer on the film with Lawrence, as well as co-writing the screenplay.

Sorrentino’s 2021 feature, The Hand of God, filmed in Naples, contains autobiographical elements. In an article about the film, The Guardian called it a coming of age story that was Sorrentino's "most personal" film to date, representing a departure from the detached style of some of his earlier work. Sorrentino also called the film "a completely different movie" in terms of style and, regarding the autobiographical elements, acknowledged that "almost everything is true." The film, which reunited Sorrentino with Toni Servillo, was selected as the Italian entry for the Best International Feature Film at the 94th Academy Awards.

As announced in 2021, Sorrentino will next direct the biopic Sue starring and produced by Lawrence as well. The movie — to be written by Lauren Schuker Blum, Rebecca Angelo and John Logan — will chronicle the life of Hollywood agent Sue Mengers as Apple Studios backs the film.  In a fierce bidding war for the film between Apple and Netflix, the package offers ranged from $80 million to $95 million for the budget.

Personal life 
When asked about the influence of the Vatican on society, Sorrentino said he was a non-believer.

In 2015, Sorrentino was awarded an Honorary Doctorate of Humane Letters at the American University of Rome.

Filmography

Feature films

Short films and documentaries

Other film work

Television

TV series

Other TV work

Bibliography

Novels
 Everybody's Right (Europa Editions, 2011)
 Gli aspetti irrilevanti (Mondadori, 2016)

Short stories
Tony Pagoda e i suoi amici (Feltrinelli, 2012)

Awards and nominations
{| class="wikitable"
|- style="text-align:center;"
! colspan="5" style="background:#B0C4DE;" | List of Accolades
|- style="text-align:center;"
! style="background:#ccc;"| Award / Film Festival
! style="background:#ccc;"| Year
! style="background:#ccc;"| Work
! style="background:#ccc;"| Nomination
! style="background:#ccc;"| Result
|-
!rowspan="2"|Academy Awards
|rowspan="1"|2014
|The Great Beauty
|rowspan="2"|Best Foreign Language Film
|
|-
|2022
|The Hand of God
|
|-
!scope="row"| Amanda Awards
|rowspan="1"|2014
|The Great Beauty
|Best Film - International
|
|-
!ASECAN Awards
|rowspan="1"|2017
|Youth
|Best Foreign Film
|
|-
!rowspan="2"| Association of Polish Filmmakers Critics Awards
|rowspan="1"|2014
|The Great Beauty
|rowspan="2"|Best Foreign Film
|
|-
|2015
|Youth
|
|-
!rowspan="1"|British Academy Film Awards
|rowspan="1"|2014
|The Great Beauty
|Best Film not in the English Language
|
|-
!rowspan="2"|Bellaria Film Festival
|rowspan="2"|2002
|rowspan="2"|One Man Up
|Best Film
|
|-
|Best Technical Contribution
|
|-
!rowspan="1"|Bangkok International Film Festival
|rowspan="1"|2006
|The Consequences of Love
|Best Film
|
|-
!rowspan="2"|Bodil Awards 
|rowspan="1"|2010
|Il Divo
|rowspan="2"|Best Non-American Film
|
|-
|2014
|The Great Beauty
|
|-
!rowspan="1"|Boston Society of Film Critics Awards 
|rowspan="1"|2013
|The Great Beauty
|rowspan="1"|Best Foreign Language Film
|
|-
!rowspan="1"|British Independent Film Awards
|rowspan="1"|2014
|The Great Beauty
|Best Foreign Independent Film
|
|-
!rowspan="2"|Buenos Aires International Festival of Independent Cinema 
|rowspan="2"|2002
|rowspan="2"|One Man Up
|Best Film
|
|-
|Youth Jury Award
|
|-
!rowspan="8"|Cannes Film Festival
|rowspan="1"|2004
|The Consequences of Love
|rowspan="3"|Palme d'Or
|
|-
|rowspan="1"|2006
|The Family Friend
|
|-
|rowspan="2"|2008
|rowspan="2"|Il Divo
|
|-
|Jury Prize
|
|-
|rowspan="2"|2011
|rowspan="2"|This Must Be the Place
|Palme d'Or
|
|-
|Prize of the Ecumenical Jury
|
|-
|rowspan="1"|2013
|The Great Beauty
|rowspan="2"|Palme d'Or
|
|-
|rowspan="1"|2015
|Youth
|
|-
!rowspan=2|César Awards
| 2014
|The Great Beauty
|rowspan=2|Best Foreign Language Film
|
|-
| 2016
|Youth
|
|-
!rowspan="1"|Chicago International Film Festival
|rowspan="1"|2006
|The Family Friend
|Best Feature
|
|-
!rowspan="1"|Florida Film Critics Circle Awards
|rowspan="1"|2013
|The Great Beauty
|Best Foreign-Language Film
|
|-
!rowspan="1"|Cinema Brazil Grand Prize
|rowspan="1"|2014
|The Great Beauty
|Best Foreign-Language Film
|
|-
!rowspan="1"|Cinemanila International Film Festival
|rowspan="1"|2014
|The Great Beauty
|Best Foreign-Language Film
|
|-
!Critics' Choice Awards
| 2014
|The Great Beauty
|Best Foreign Language Film
|
|-
! Cinemanila International Film Festival
|2013
|The Great Beauty
|Lino Brocka Award for Best Film
|
|-
!rowspan="18"|David di Donatello
|rowspan="2"|2002
|rowspan="2"|One Man Up
|Best New Director 
|
|-
|Best Screenplay
|
|-
|rowspan="3"|2005
|rowspan="3"|The Consequences of Love
|Best Director 
|
|-
|Best Screenplay
|
|-
|Best Film
|
|-
|rowspan="3"|2009
|rowspan="3"|Il Divo
|Best Director 
|
|-
|Best Screenplay
|
|-
|Best Film
|
|-
|rowspan="3"|2012
|rowspan="3"|This Must Be the Place
|Best Director 
|
|-
|Best Screenplay
|
|-
|Best Film
|
|-
|rowspan="4"|2014
|rowspan="4"|The Great Beauty
|David of the Youth
|
|-
|Best Director 
|
|-
|Best Screenplay
|
|-
|Best Film
|
|-
|rowspan="3"|2016
|rowspan="3"|Youth
|Best Director 
|
|-
|Best Screenplay
|
|-
|Best Film
|
|-
!rowspan="2"|Detroit Film Critics Society
|rowspan="2"|2015
|rowspan="2"|Youth
|Best Director
|
|-
|Best Film
|
|-
!rowspan="1"|Dresden Film Festival
|rowspan="1"|2010
|La Partita Lenta
|Best Short Fiction Film - International 
|
|-
!rowspan="9"|European Film Awards
|rowspan="1"|2005
|The Consequences of Love
|rowspan="2"|Best Director
|
|-
|rowspan="2"|2008
|rowspan="2"|Il Divo
|
|-
|Best Screenwriter
|
|-
|rowspan="3"|2013
|rowspan="3"|The Great Beauty
|Best Film
|
|-
|Best Director
|
|-
|Best Screenwriter
|
|-
|rowspan="3"|2015
|rowspan="3"|Youth
|Best Film
|
|-
|Best Director
|
|-
|Best Screenwriter
|
|-
!rowspan="3"|FICE Awards
|rowspan="1"|2005
|The Consequences of Love
|rowspan="2"|Best Italian Film 
|
|-
|rowspan="2"|2012
|rowspan="2"|This Must Be the Place
|
|-
|Best Foreign Language Film
|
|-
!Florida Film Critics Circle Awards
|2013
|The Great Beauty
|Best Foreign Language Film
|
|-
!rowspan="1"|Gold Derby Awards
|rowspan="1"|2014
|The Great Beauty
|Best Foreign Language Film
|
|-
!rowspan="2"|Golden Globe Awards
|rowspan="1"|2014
|The Great Beauty
|Foreign Language Film
|
|-
|rowspan="1"|2022
|The Hand of God
|Foreign Language Film
|
|-
!rowspan="1"|Goya Awards
|rowspan="1"|2014
|The Great Beauty
|Best European Film
|
|-
!rowspan="1"|Gotham Awards
|rowspan="1"|2019
|L'amica geniale 
|Breakthrough Series - Longform
|
|-
!rowspan="3"|Hollywood Film Awards
|rowspan="3"|2013
|rowspan="3"|The Great Beauty
|Best International Film
|
|-
|Best Independent Film
|
|-
|Best New Screenplay
|
|-
!rowspan="1"|Independent Spirit Awards
|rowspan="1"|2014
|The Great Beauty
|Best Foreign Film
|
|-
!rowspan="2"|International Cinephile Society Awards
|rowspan="2"|2014
|rowspan="2"|The Great Beauty
| Best Film
| 
|-
| Best Foreign Film
| 
|-
!rowspan="1"|Karlovy Vary International Film Festival
|rowspan="1"|2015
|Youth
|Audience Award
|
|-
!rowspan="1"|Kineo Awards
|rowspan="1"|2017
|This Must Be the Place
|Best Film
|
|-
!rowspan="1"|L'Association des Critiques de Séries
|rowspan="1"|2017
|The Young Pope
|Best Direction
|
|-
!rowspan="2"|London Critics Circle Film Awards
|rowspan="2"|2014
|rowspan="2"|The Great Beauty
|Director of the Year
|
|-
|Best Foreign Language Film
|
|-
!rowspan="1"|Los Angeles Film Critics Association 
|rowspan="1"|2013
|The Great Beauty
|Best Foreign Film
|
|-
!rowspan="1"|Munich International Film Festival 
|rowspan="1"|2013
|The Great Beauty
|Best International Film
|
|-
!rowspan="15"|Nastro d'Argento 
|rowspan="2"|2002
|rowspan="2"|One Man Up
|Best New Director
|
|-
|Best Screenplay 
|
|-
|rowspan="2"|2005
|rowspan="2"|The Consequences of Love
|Best Director 
|
|-
|rowspan="2"|Best Original Story 
|
|-
|rowspan="1"|2007
|rowspan="1"|The Family Friend 
|
|-
|rowspan="2"|2009
|rowspan="2"|Il Divo
|Best Director 
|
|-
|Best Screenplay 
|
|-
|rowspan="2"|2012
|rowspan="2"|This Must Be the Place 
|Best Director 
|
|-
|Best Screenplay 
|
|-
|rowspan="2"|2013
|rowspan="2"|The Great Beauty
|Best Director 
|
|-
|Best Screenplay 
|
|-
|rowspan="2"|2015
|rowspan="2"|Youth
|Best Director 
|
|-
|Best Script 
|
|-
|rowspan="2"|2018
|rowspan="2"|Loro
|Best Film 
|
|-
|Best Screenplay 
|
|-
!rowspan="1"|Ostend Film Festival 
|rowspan="1"|2015
|Youth
|Look Prize
|
|-
!rowspan="2"|Polish Film Awards
|rowspan="1"|2015
|The Great Beauty
|rowspan="2"|Best European Film
|
|-
|rowspan="1"|2016
|Youth
|
|-
!rowspan="1"|Prêmio Guarani
|rowspan="1"|2014
|The Great Beauty
|Best Foreign Film
|
|-
!rowspan="1"|Raindance Film Festival
|rowspan="1"|2009
|La Partita Lenta
|Film of the Festival
|
|-
!rowspan="2"|Robert Awards
|rowspan="1"|2014
|The Great Beauty
|rowspan="2"|Best Non-American Film
|
|-
|rowspan="1"|2017
|Youth
|
|-
!rowspan="1"|Salerno Shadowline Film Festival
|rowspan="1"|2014
|One Man Up
|Best Film
|
|-
!rowspan="1"|Sant Jordi Awards
|rowspan="1"|2014
|The Great Beauty
|Best Foreign Film
|
|-
!rowspan="1"|Satellite Awards
|rowspan="1"|2014
|The Great Beauty
|Best Foreign Film
|
|-
!rowspan="1"|Seattle Film Critics Society
|rowspan="1"|2014
|The Great Beauty
|Best Foreign-Language Film
|
|-
!rowspan=3|Seville European Film Festival
|2008
|Il Divo 
|Eurimages Award
|
|-
|rowspan=2|2013
|rowspan=2|The Great Beauty
|Best Co-Production
|
|-
|Asecan Award (Special Mention)
|
|-
!rowspan=3|Tallinn Black Nights Film Festival
|2006
|The Family Friend
|rowspan=3|Grand Prize
|
|-
|2008
|Il Divo 
|
|-
|2013
|The Great Beauty
|
|-
!rowspan=2|Torino Film Festival
|1998
|L'amore non ha confini 
|Best Italian Fiction Film
|
|-
|2001
|Himself 
|Giuseppe De Santis Award
|
|-
!rowspan="1"|Tribeca Film Festival
|rowspan="1"|2002
|One Man Up
|Best Narrative Feature
|
|-
!rowspan="1"|Turia Awards
|rowspan="1"|2014
|The Great Beauty
|Best Foreign Film
|
|-
!rowspan="5"|Venice Film Festival
|2008
|Il Divo
|rowspan="2"|SIAE Award
|
|-
|rowspan="2"|2016
|rowspan="2"|The Young Pope
|
|-
|Fondazione Mimmo Rotella Award
|
|-
|rowspan="2"|2021
|rowspan="2"|The Hand of God
|Golden Lion
|
|-
|Grand Jury Prize
|
|-
!rowspan="1"| Zurich Film Festival
|rowspan="1"| 2021
|rowspan="1"| Lifetime Achievement
|Tribute to…Award
|
|-

References

External links

Paolo Sorrentino
1970 births
Living people
Film people from Naples
Italian film directors
Italian screenwriters
Italian male screenwriters
David di Donatello winners
Ciak d'oro winners
European Film Award for Best Director winners
Nastro d'Argento winners
English-language film directors
Directors of Best Foreign Language Film Academy Award winners
Filmmakers who won the Best Foreign Language Film BAFTA Award
University of Naples Federico II alumni